These are the results of the Belgian athletes at the European Athletics Championships.

List of medalists

Men

Women

See also 
 Belgium at the IAAF World Championships in Athletics
 Belgium at the IAAF World Indoor Championships in Athletics
 Belgium at the European Athletics Indoor Championships

 
Nations at the European Athletics Championships
Athletics in Belgium